Slakovci is a village in Stari Jankovci municipality of Vukovar-Syrmia County in eastern Croatia. It is connected by the D46 state road. The village is physically connected with the village of Srijemske Laze. The village is connected with the rest of the country by the D46 state road connecting it with the town of Vinkovci and continuing into Serbia as the State Road 120 to the nearest town of Šid.

Name
The name of the village in Croatian is plural.

History 
Slakovci were first mentioned in 1491. They got their name from the weed "slak" or the Hungarian word "slavok" which means Slavs. The feudal family of Gorjanski built a fort in Slavkovci for defense against the Turks. The Turks ruled the Slakovci from 1526 to 1691, and after that the Slakovci belonged to the military territory.

See also
Slakovci railway station
Church of Saint Anne, Slakovci

References

External links
Aerial view of the village on the Stari Jankovci Municipality You-Tube Page

Populated places in Vukovar-Syrmia County
Populated places in Syrmia